White Fury is a 1990 suspense action film directed by David A. Prior and starring Deke Anderson, Sean Holton, Douglas Harter, Christine Shinn and William Berg. It was produced by Kimberley Casey.

Story
The film stars Deke Anderson in the lead role as Tyler, a bank robber and criminal who along with accomplice Marcus (Played by  Michael Kaskel), are on the run. Danny is champion snowboarder who along with his girlfriend Christine and friends Greg and Lesley decide to take a break from the daily grind and head out of town and relax in a cabin out in the snowy Colorado wilderness. Things change for the young holiday makers when during a blizzard they end up becoming victims. The two ruthless criminals Tyler and Marcus end up taking the cabin's occupants hostage. In addition to some snowboarding in the film, a rocket-launcher is also featured.

Cast

 Deke Anderson  ... Tyler 
 Sean Holton  ... Danny 
 Douglas Harter  ... Martin Towers 
 Christine Shinn  ... Christine 
 William Berg  ... Greg 
 Chasity Hammons  ... Lesley 
 Michael Kaskel  ... Marcus 
 John Clauson  ... Marvin 
 James Milholland  ... Detective 
 James M. Cimbura  ... Shop Owner 
 Kipp Lockwood  ... Officer 
 John Stadler  ... Ranger #1 
 Frank Mancini  ... Ranger #2 
 Ken Westover  ... Ranger #3 
 John von Neumann  ... Bank Manager 
 Jolene Chavan  ... Bank Teller 
 Jill Webb  ... Bank Teller 
 Peggy Crohan  ... Bank Teller 
 Sandie Sanderberg  ... Bank Personnel 
 Chris Bennett  ... Bank Personnel 
 Jacqueline Carbone  ... Bank Customer 
 David A. Churchill  ... Bank Customer

 Sand Baker  ... Bank Customer 
 Dan M. Alder  ... Bank Customer 
 Rusty Sandberg  ... Bank Customer 
 Tom Hartleb  ... Bank Customer 
 Deborah Sclar  ... Bank Customer 
 Brian Roberts  ... Bank Customer 
 Douglas G. Price  ... Bank Customer 
 Jennifer Perkins  ... Bank Customer 
 Robb Kyuik  ... Race Crowd Extra 
 Norm McGinnis  ... Race Crowd Extra 
 Theodore P. Sager  ... Race Crowd Extra 
 A.B. Kutchinsky  ... Race Crowd Extra 
 Daniel Fitzpatrick  ... Race Crowd Extra 
 Kit Graham  ... Race Crowd Extra 
 Charles Rools  ... Race Crowd Extra 
 Francie Bosley  ... Race Crowd Extra 
 Gwendolyn Scully  ... Race Crowd Extra 
 Shana Burch  ... Race Crowd Extra 
 Jodie Skalla  ... Race Crowd Extra 
 Suzanne Diaz  ... Race Crowd Extra 
 Ann Winslow  ... Race Crowd Extra

Crew
 Director ... David A. Prior 
 Producers ... Kimberley Casey, Bruce Lewin 
 Writers ... David A. Prior, John Cianetti 
 Editor ... Lawrence L. Simeone

References

External links

Reviews
 Comeuppance Reviews: White Fury
 International Syndicate of Cult Film Critics White Fury
 Daily Grindhouse: 2. White Fury

Films directed by David A. Prior
1990 films
1990s action films
1990s exploitation films
1990s English-language films
American action thriller films
American exploitation films
1990s American films